I Saw the TV Glow is an upcoming American horror film, written and directed by Jane Schoenbrun. It stars Justice Smith and Brigette Lundy-Paine, with Danielle Deadwyler, Phoebe Bridgers, and Fred Durst, amongst others, in supporting roles.

Emma Stone and Dave McCary serve as  producers under their Fruit Tree banner.

Plot
Two teenagers bond over their love of a television series; after it is mysteriously cancelled, their reality begins to blur.

Cast
 Justice Smith
 Brigette Lundy-Paine
 Helena Howard
 Danielle Deadwyler
 Amber Benson
 Ian Foreman
 Michael Maronna
 Conner O'Malley
 Emma Portner
 Danny Tamberelli
 Phoebe Bridgers
 Lindsey Jordan
 Fred Durst
 Haley Dahl
 Kristina Esfandiari
 Jonathan Chacko

Production
In October 2021, it was announced Jane Schoenbrun would direct the film, from a screenplay they wrote, with Emma Stone set to produce under her Fruit Tree banner, with A24 producing, financing, and distributing. In August 2022, it was announced Justice Smith, Brigette Lundy-Paine, Helena Howard, Danielle Deadwyler, Amber Benson, Ian Foreman, Michael Maronna, Conner O'Malley, Emma Portner, Danny Tamberelli, Phoebe Bridgers, Lindsey Jordan, Fred Durst, Haley Dahl, Jonathan Chacko, and Kristina Esfandiari had joined the cast of the film.

Principal photography began in July 2022 and concluded on August 17, 2022.

References

External links
 

Upcoming films
American horror films
A24 (company) films